This article provides a grammar sketch of the Miskito language, the language of the Miskito people of the Atlantic coast of Nicaragua and Honduras, a member of the Misumalpan language family and also a strongly Germanic (English, Dutch and German) influenced language. There also exists a brief typological overview of the language that summarizes the language's most salient features of general typological interest in more technical terms. Miskito language is widely spoken in Honduras and Nicaragua as Spanish, it is also an official language in the Atlantic region of these countries. With more than 8,000,000 speakers, Miskito has positioned in the second place in both countries after Spanish. Miskito is not only spoken in Central America, but in Europe (United Kingdom, Germany, Sweden, Netherlands, Spain, Switzerland, France and Italy), USA, Canada and in many other Latin American countries there are Miskitos who made their lives and maintain their culture and language alive. Miskito used to be a royal state language (Miskito Kingdom XVI, XVII, XVII, XIX).

Miskito Alphabet 

Miskito alphabet has the tendency to be very similar to German and in some cases slightly English. The alphabet has 21 consonants and 5 vowels. 

A (a), B (be), C (ce), D (de), E (e), F (ef), G (ge), H (ha), I (i), J (jei), K (ka), L (el), M (em), N (en), O (o), P (pi), Q (ku), R (ar), S (es), T (te), U (u), V (ve), W (dubilu), X (eks), Y (yei), Z (zet).

Introducing yourself in Miskito 

Hello – Naksa!
Good morning – Titan yamni.
Good afternoon – Tutni yamni.
Good evening – Saiwan yamni.
My name is (John)... – Yang nini (John)...
Nice to meet you – Uba lilia. 
It's nice to meet you too – Simsat.
Where are you from – Man ani wina? 
I am from (USA)...- Yang (Stech)...wina. 
See you –  Wal prawbia.
Take care – Kaiki tauks.
Goodbye – Aisabe!

Phonology

Phonemes 

The exact status of vowel length is not clear; long vowels are not consistently indicated in Miskito writing.

Suprasegmentals 

Word stress is generally on the first syllable of each word.

Phonotactics

Noun phrase

Determiners and quantifiers

Ligature 

Ligature is a term (with precedents in other languages) for describing a grammatical feature of Miskito traditionally referred to with less accuracy in the Miskito context as 'construct'. A ligature is a morpheme (often -ka) which occurs when a noun is linked to some other element in the noun phrase. In Miskito, most of the elements that require the presence of ligature are ones that precede the head noun:

Ligature takes a variety of forms:

Some nouns take no ligature morpheme; these mostly denote parts of the body (e.g. bila 'mouth', napa 'tooth', kakma 'nose') or kinship (e.g. lakra 'opposite-sex sibling'), although there is only an imperfect correlation between membership of this morphological class and semantic inalienability (see also relationals below).

Possession

The plural

Adjectives

Pronouns and adverbs 
The personal pronouns differentiate three persons and also have an exclusive/inclusive distinction in the first person plural. The general plural morpheme nani or -nan is added to form plurals (except with yawan). Use of these pronouns is optional when person is indexed in the possessed form, relational or verb group.

The pronouns are not case-specific, and may, under comparable conditions, be marked by the same postpositions as other noun phrases.

Postpositions

Relationals 

Relationals are quasi-nouns expressing some relationship (often spatial) to their possessor complement. Many of the relationals perceivably originate in locatives (in -ra) of nouns designating parts of the body employed metaphorically to convey spatial or other relations.

The verbal group

Overview 

Finite forms include several tenses and moods, in each of which the person (but not number) of the subject is marked by suffixes. The tenses themselves have characteristic suffixes which combine with the subject-indexing suffixes.

In addition to synthetic (simple) tenses, there is also a considerable range of periphrastic (compound) tenses. These are formed with a non-finite form of the main verb followed by an auxiliary verb.

Some of the synthetic tenses represent original periphrastic tense structures that have become welded into single words. This helps to explain why there are two different forms each in the present, past and future. (The sample verb used is pulaia 'play', stem pul-, given here in the third-person form of each tense.)

In addition to a subject index which form part of a verb's suffix, for transitive verbs the verb group includes  an object index  in the form of a preverbal particle marking the person (but not the number) of the object. The subject markers vary somewhat according to the tense, but the most usual forms are shown in the following table (see below for more details).

Conjugation 

The stem of a verb is obtained by removing the -aia suffix from the infinitive. Most verb stems end in a consonant, and are conjugated as follows (our sample verb is pulaia 'play').

Verbs whose stems end in i (bri- 'have', wi- 'tell', pi- 'eat', di- 'drink', swi- 'allow') vary from the above paradigm in a few minor points. Bal-aia 'come' and w-aia 'go', have an irregular Present I tense. The verb yabaia 'give' is anomalous in a different way by having irregularly derived non-third-person object-indexing forms. Finally, the most irregular verb of all is the defective and irregular kaia 'to be'.

Use of tenses

Switch reference and non-finite verb forms

Periphrastic tenses 

The range of aspectual, modal and other notions that can be expressed is enlarged considerably by the availability of various periphrastic constructions in which a verb acting as auxiliary is placed after the main verb. The conjugated component can take a variety of tenses, including periphrastic ones, and the periphrases themselves may often be combined; thus chains of several auxiliaries are possible. Some representative examples of such periphrases follow:

Syntax

Word order

Propositional structure 

While no systematic case marking differentiates formally between subjects and objects, there exist (apart from word order) certain option for achieving disambiguation.

Information structure 

A system of specialized postpositions is used to identify topics and focused constituents:

Valency 

Most verbs are built up from a monosyllabic lexical root ending in a vowel or a single consonant, to which an extension or stem consonant is very often added. The extensions correlate with transitivity: transitive stems have either -k- or -b- (unpredictably), while intransitive stems have -w-. There is also a valency-decreasing verb-prefix ai- which, added to transitive stems, produces unergative, reflexive, reciprocal or middle verbs. See the section on Derivation (below) for examples.

Negation

Questions

Sentence mood particles

Coordinating conjunctions

Relative clauses 

There are two major constructions which may be used to form relative clauses in Miskito, the 'external head' strategy and the 'internal head' strategy.

Complement clauses

Conditional and concessive clauses

Circumstantial clauses

Lexicon

General 
As regards origin, the Miskito lexicon consists of the following principal components:

 words of native Miskito origin;
 a considerable number of loans from surrounding languages of the related Sumo group;
 a large number of loan words from English;
 a smaller number of words borrowed from Spanish.

Derivation 
Some derivational affixes:

Lexical compounds

See also 

Miskito language
Miskito language (typological overview)
Miskito
Misumalpan languages

Bibliography 

 Richter, Elke (no date). Observaciones acerca del desarrollo lexical miskito en Nicaragua. 
 Salamanca, Danilo (no date). Gramática escolar del Miskito/Manual de Gramática del Miskito. Draft version formerly on the Internet.
Salamanca, Danilo (2008). EI idioma miskito: estado de la lengua y características tipológicas.
Ramsin S., Felix (2021). Writer, Modern Miskito Grammar specialist.
M. Brown, Dionisio. Writer, Miskito Grammar specialist.

External links 
Ethnologue
Diccionario Miskito by Danilo Salamanca
Lengua Miskito (PROEL: Promotora Española de Lingüística) — short page in Spanish containing several errors
Gospel Recordings Network: Miskito — sound recordings
A Lexicographic Study of Ulwa by Thomas Michael Green
Dictionary of the Ulwa Language (includes sentences translated into Miskito)
Bibliography
Miskitu Aisas (an unfinished Miskito course at Wikibooks)

Grammar
Native American grammars
Misumalpan languages
Indigenous languages of Central America